Robert Wright (1560–1643) was an English bishop, first holding the see of Bristol and then the see of Lichfield and Coventry. He died at an episcopal palace, under siege in the First English Civil War.

Life
Wright was born of humble parentage in St Albans, Hertfordshire, in 1560, and probably attended the refounded free school there (now St Albans School), where preference was given to poor scholars of the borough.  He matriculated at Trinity College, Oxford in 1574 at the age of 14, was elected to a scholarship in 1575, and graduated as a B.A. in 1580, becoming a fellow the next year. He proceeded to obtain an M.A. in 1584, a B.D. in 1592 and a D.D. in 1597.

In 1601, Wright was made Canon Residentiary and Treasurer of Wells, a post he held until 1632. He was appointed chaplain to both Queen Elizabeth I and James I. In 1613 he was appointed the first warden of the newly established Wadham College, resigning three months later as the college required the warden to remain celibate, but Wright had obtained Royal dispensation to marry. A daughter, Hester was born soon after and went on to marry Sir Humphrey Style of Langley (Beckenham) and after his death in 1659 John Scott of Hayes Place (Kent). A son, Calvert, was born in 1620 and baptised at Sonning Church in Berkshire where Robert had been vicar since 1604. In 1623, he was appointed as Bishop of Bristol, and was later translated to the See of Lichfield and Coventry in 1632.

He died at the seat of the Bishops of Lichfield, Eccleshall Castle in Staffordshire, in September 1643 but, as the castle was under siege by Parliamentarians at the time, could not be properly buried.

References

External links
 Royal Berkshire History: Robert Wright
 D. J. Oldridge, 'Wright, Robert (1560–1643)', Oxford Dictionary of National Biography, Oxford University Press, 2004
 Wardens of Wadham College

1560 births
1643 deaths
Alumni of Trinity College, Oxford
Bishops of Bristol
Bishops of Lichfield
People from St Albans
17th-century Church of England bishops
People from Sonning
17th-century English clergy
16th-century English clergy
Wardens of Wadham College, Oxford